The National Parks and Wildlife Act 1974 is the legislation passed by the New South Wales Parliament with the explicit intent of conserving the's natural and cultural heritage of the state of New South Wales; fostering public appreciation, understanding and enjoyment of its natural and cultural heritage; and managing any lands reserved for the purposes of conserving and fostering public appreciation and enjoyment of its natural and/or cultural heritage.

Cultural heritage

Overview
The cultural heritage the National Parks and Wildlife Act 1974 seeks to conserve (and foster public appreciation, understanding and enjoyment of) includes "..places, objects and features of significance to Aboriginal people.."; "places of social value to the people of New South Wales.."; and "places of historic, architectural or scientific significance".

Aboriginal heritage
The National Parks and Wildlife Act 1974 is the primary legislation in New South Wales relied upon  within the state to effectively manage and protect the state's Aboriginal cultural heritage

Section 84 provides for a place to be designated an "Aboriginal place", that "is or was of special significance with respect to Aboriginal culture", which enables special protections to be put in place.

See also 
Australian heritage law
National Parks and Wildlife Service (New South Wales)

References

External links

New South Wales heritage law
New South Wales legislation
1974 in Australian law
1970s in New South Wales